The South South (often hyphenated to the South-South) is one of the six geopolitical zones of Nigeria representing both a geographic and political region of the country's eastern coast. It comprises six states – Akwa Ibom, Bayelsa, Cross River, Delta, Edo, and Rivers. 

The zone stretches along the Atlantic seaboard from the Bight of Benin coast in the west to the Bight of Bonny coast in the east. It encloses much of the Niger Delta, which is instrumental in the environment and economic development of the region. Geographically, the zone is divided with the Central African mangroves in the coastal far south while the major inland ecoregions are–from east to west–the Cross–Sanaga–Bioko coastal forests, Cross–Niger transition forests, Niger Delta swamp forests, and Nigerian lowland forests.

Although the South South represents only ~5% of Nigerian territory, it contributes greatly to the Nigerian economy due to extensive oil and natural gas reserves. The region has a population of about 26 million people, around 12% of the total population of the country. Port Harcourt and Benin City are the most populous cities in the South South as well as the fourth and fifth most populous cities in Nigeria. Port Harcourt and its suburbs, together called Greater Port Harcourt, form the largest metropolitan area in the zone with about 3 million people; other large South-South cities include (in order by population) Warri/Uvwie, Calabar, Uyo, Ikot Ekpene, Ugep, Sapele, Buguma, Uromi, Ughelli, Ikom, and Asaba.

History
The South South Region was created from  both the Western and Eastern regions of Nigeria in 1997 through the recommendation of Alex Ekwueme panel , by the regime of General Sani Abacha.
Edo and Delta states formerly Bendel state from the Western region, while Bayelsa, Rivers, Akwa Ibom and Cross river states from the Eastern region.

Languages
Akwa Ibom
Ibibio
Annang
Efik-Ibibio
Oro language
Obolo language
Bayelsa
Izon
Ogbia
Epie
Cross River
Efik
Humono
Yala
Nde-nsele-nta
Boki
Etung
Legbo-Agbo
Ejagham
Ekoi
Ekajuk
Yakurr
Efut
Delta
Enuani 
Urhobo
Isoko
Ika
Ukwuani 
Itsekiri
Igbo 
Ndokwa
Yoruba 
Izon etc.
Edo
Esan
Etsako
Ika Igbanke
Bini
Rivers
Andoni 
Okrika
Kalabari
Engenni
Ikwerre  
Ogba   
Etche .           
Ekpeye 
Ndoki
Igbo 
Ukwuani           
Egbema
ijaw
Nkoro
Ogoni
Degema
Abua
Odual

There are multiple different tribes in this area such as Ika, itshekiri Ukwuani Aniocha, Ijaw, Urhobo, Isoko, Ozanogogo, and Abavo.

References 

Subdivisions of Nigeria